Rizal, officially the Municipality of Jose P. Rizal,, is a 1st class municipality in the province of Palawan, Philippines. According to the 2020 census, it has a population of 56,162 people.

Prior to its formation as a separate municipality, the place was known as Tarumpitao Point and was part of the Municipality of Quezon. By virtue of Batas Pambansa Blg. 386, it was formed as a municipality on April 14, 1983, called Marcos. It was renamed after José Rizal in 1987 through Republic Act No. 6652.

The municipality is home to the Singnapan charcoal petrographs.

Geography

Barangays
Rizal is politically subdivided into 11 barangays.
 Bunog
 Campong Ulay
 Candawaga
 Canipaan
 Culasian
 Iraan
 Latud
 Panalingaan
 Punta Baja
 Ransang
 Taburi

Climate

Demographics

Among the ethnic groups in Rizal are the Tao't Bato people. These people settle in caves during the rainy season and resides at Singnapan Valley area in Barangay Ransang.

Economy

Singnapan Cave Petrographs
The charcoal-drawn petrographs of the Singnapan Valley are one of the most important ancient paintings in the country. The date of the paintings have yet to be scientifically established. Due to its high significance, it was submitted by the National Commission for Culture and the Arts of the Philippines to the UNESCO Tentative List of Heritage Sites in 2006, pending its inclusion in the World Heritage List along with the Alab petroglyphs of Mountain Province, Angono Petroglyphs of Rizal province, charcoal-drawn Penablanca petrographs of Cagayan, and the Anda red hermatite print petrographs of Bohol.

References

External links
Rizal Profile at PhilAtlas.com
[ Philippine Standard Geographic Code]
Philippine Census Information
Local Governance Performance Management System

Municipalities of Palawan